Nathaly Josefina Grimán Herrera (born 29 December 1991) is a Venezuelan freestyle wrestler. She is a gold medalist at the Central American and Caribbean Games and a two-time gold medalist at the Bolivarian Games. She is also a four-time bronze medalist at the Pan American Wrestling Championships.

Career 

She competed in the women's 63kg event at the 2013 World Wrestling Championships held in Budapest, Hungary. She won one of the bronze medals in the women's 63kg event at the 2014 Pan American Wrestling Championships held in Mexico City, Mexico.

She also won one of the bronze medals in the same event at the 2015 Pan American Wrestling Championships held in Santiago, Chile. A few months later, she competed in her event at the 2015 Pan American Games held in Toronto, Canada. She was eliminated in her first match by eventual bronze medalist Jackeline Rentería of Colombia. In that same year, she competed in the 63kg event at the 2015 World Wrestling Championships held in Las Vegas, United States where she was also eliminated in her first match.

She competed at the 2016 Pan American Olympic Qualification Tournament hoping to qualify for the 2016 Summer Olympics held in Rio de Janeiro, Brazil. She did not qualify for the Olympics at this tournament. She also competed at the first and second World Olympic Qualification Tournaments. She was eliminated in her first match at the tournament held in Ulaanbaatar, Mongolia. She came close to qualifying for the Olympics at the second tournament held in Istanbul, Turkey: she reached the semifinals where she lost against Henna Johansson of Sweden.

She won one of the bronze medals in the women's 63kg event at the 2017 Pan American Wrestling Championships held in Lauro de Freitas, Brazil. In that same year, she won the gold medal in her event at the 2017 Bolivarian Games held in Santa Marta, Colombia. She defeated Jackeline Rentería of Colombia in her gold medal match.

In 2018, she won the silver medal in the women's 62kg event at the South American Games held in Cochabamba, Bolivia. At the 2018 Central American and Caribbean Games held in Barranquilla, Colombia, she won the gold medal in the women's 62kg event. She was eliminated in her first match in the women's 62kg event at the 2018 World Wrestling Championships held in Budapest, Hungary.

At the 2019 Pan American Wrestling Championships held in Buenos Aires, Argentina, she won one of the bronze medals in the women's 62kg event. A few months later, she lost her bronze medal match against Laís Nunes of Brazil in the women's 62kg event at the 2019 Pan American Games held in Lima, Peru. At the 2019 World Wrestling Championships held in Nur-Sultan, Kazakhstan, she was eliminated in her second match by Mariana Cherdivara of Moldova.

She competed at the 2020 Pan American Olympic Qualification Tournament held in Ottawa, Canada, hoping to qualify for the 2020 Summer Olympics in Tokyo, Japan. She did not qualify at this tournament and she also failed to qualify for the Olympics at the World Olympic Qualification Tournament held in Sofia, Bulgaria. She won the silver medal in her event at the 2021 Dan Kolov & Nikola Petrov Tournament held in Plovdiv, Bulgaria.

She won the gold medal in the women's 62kg event at the 2022 Bolivarian Games held in Valledupar, Colombia. She defeated Leonela Ayoví of Ecuador in her gold medal match. She won the silver medal in her event at the 2022 South American Games held in Asunción, Paraguay.

Achievements

References

External links 
 

Living people
1991 births
Place of birth missing (living people)
Venezuelan female sport wrestlers
Central American and Caribbean Games gold medalists for Venezuela
Competitors at the 2018 Central American and Caribbean Games
Central American and Caribbean Games medalists in wrestling
South American Games silver medalists for Venezuela
South American Games medalists in wrestling
Competitors at the 2018 South American Games
Competitors at the 2022 South American Games
Pan American Wrestling Championships medalists
Wrestlers at the 2015 Pan American Games
Wrestlers at the 2019 Pan American Games
Pan American Games competitors for Venezuela
21st-century Venezuelan women